Biləsuvar (also, Bilyasuvar, Belyasuvar, and Belayasuvar) is a village in the Bilasuvar Rayon of Azerbaijan.

References 

Populated places in Bilasuvar District